The United Arab Emirates competed at the 2004 Summer Olympics in Athens, Greece, from 13 to 29 August 2004. This was the nation's sixth consecutive appearance at the Olympics.

The United Arab Emirates National Olympic Committee sent a total of four men to the Games. Skeet shooter Saeed Al Maktoum reprised his role as the nation's flag bearer for the second time in the opening ceremony.

United Arab Emirates left Athens with its first Olympic gold medal in history. It was officially awarded to Al Maktoum's brother Ahmed in men's double trap shooting.

Medalists

Athletics

Emirati athletes have so far achieved qualifying standards in the following athletics events (up to a maximum of 3 athletes in each event at the 'A' Standard, and 1 at the 'B' Standard). 

Men

Shooting 

Men

Swimming 

Men

See also
 United Arab Emirates at the 2002 Asian Games
 United Arab Emirates at the 2004 Summer Paralympics

References

External links
Official Report of the XXVIII Olympiad
UAE National Olympic Committee 

Nations at the 2004 Summer Olympics
2004
Olympics